Melissa Marty Caro (born July 26, 1984, in Mayagüez) is a Puerto Rican beauty pageant titleholder and TV Host. Marty placed as a semi-finalist in Miss Puerto Rico Universe 2008, competing as "Miss Caguas."  She then became a contestant on the reality show/beauty contest Nuestra Belleza Latina, and after weeks of competition and eliminations, she won the grand prize of over $100,000, a contract with Univision and earned the title of Nuestra Belleza Latina 2008.

She is a member of Mu Alpha Phi sorority. After winning Nuestra Belleza Latina she gained national exposure and worked as an entertainment host on shows on Univision, Galavision and the Telefutura network.

In 2012, Marty moved to Los Angeles, California to pursue an acting career. In 2014, she worked as a co-host of the morning show El Coffee Break on the Azteca America network until it was cancelled on April 18, 2014.

In 2015 Marty wed longtime boyfriend Nelson Rosa.

Filmography

Film

Television

Notes

References

External links
 

1984 births
Living people
People from Mayagüez, Puerto Rico
Puerto Rican beauty pageant winners
Participants in American reality television series
Nuestra Belleza Latina winners